Kenwick is a neighborhood in southeastern Lexington, Kentucky, United States. Its boundaries are Sherman Avenue to the south, East Main Street to the west, railroad tracks to the north, and Richmond Avenue to the north.

Neighborhood Statistics

 Area: 
 Population: 1,559
 Population density: 6,241 people per square mile
 Median household income (2010):  $54,221

References

Neighborhoods in Lexington, Kentucky